Alaska has about 3,197 officially named natural lakes, out of over 3,000,000 unnamed natural lakes, approximately 67 named artificial reservoirs, and 167 named dams.
For named artificial reservoirs and dams, see the List of dams and reservoirs in Alaska.

List

See also 

List of islands of Alaska
List of reservoirs and dams of Alaska
List of rivers of Alaska
List of waterfalls of Alaska

Notes

Gallery

References

General references 

Lakes

Alaska